Juri Rappsilber (born 1971) is a German chemist in the area of mass spectrometry and proteomics.

Career

Rappsilber studied chemistry at the Technical University of Berlin, University of Strathclyde, and with Tom Rapoport, Harvard Medical School. In 2001, he earned his Ph.D. in Proteomics jointly from EMBL Heidelberg and the Goethe University Frankfurt working in the laboratory of Matthias Mann on the mass spectrometric analysis of protein complexes, externally supervised by Michael Karas. He followed Mann to the University of Southern Denmark and completed a postdoctoral fellowship before starting his independent career at IFOM - FIRC Institute for Molecular Oncology, Milan in 2003. In 2006, he joined the Wellcome Trust Centre for Cell Biology in the Institute of Cell Biology at the University of Edinburgh. In 2009, he became a senior research fellow of the Wellcome Trust, in 2010 he was appointed Professor of Proteomics in Edinburgh. Since 2011, he has been Full Professor and head of the Chair of Bioanalytics at the Technical University of Berlin.

Research

Rappsilber’s interests are focused on combining chemistry and computer science with biological mass spectrometry to expand the current knowledge on how cells work. His lab is working on novel methods for identifying and quantifying the interactions and the accurate sites of interaction of proteins with other proteins, DNA and RNA. As a central tool they have pioneered crosslinking mass spectrometry. Technologically, they bridge organic chemistry, protein & nucleotide chemistry, molecular biology, separation sciences, mass spectrometry, data visualisation, programming and machine learning. Their vision is to reveal the dynamic structure and interactions of every protein in a cell, in a time-resolved manner.

Awards

 2021 Elected EMBO Member
 2009 Senior Research Fellow of the Wellcome Trust
 2005 Marie Curie Excellence Fellow
 2001 Marie Curie Fellow

References

External links
 
 
 Website at Unifying Systems in Catalysis (UniSysCat)

Academics of the University of Edinburgh
Academic staff of the Technical University of Berlin
Technical University of Berlin alumni
Goethe University Frankfurt alumni
German chemists
German biochemists
Mass spectrometrists
Living people
1971 births
Members of the European Molecular Biology Organization